Comrades: Almost a Love Story is a 1996 Hong Kong film starring Maggie Cheung, Leon Lai, Eric Tsang, and Kristy Yang. It was directed by Peter Chan. The Chinese title refers to "Tian Mi Mi", a song by Teresa Teng whose songs are featured in the film. It was filmed on location in Hong Kong and New York City. Leon Lai later commented in 1997 that the story of Li Xiao Jun is somewhat a description of his own life.

Plot
The film, spanning years, centres on two Chinese mainlanders who migrate to Hong Kong to make a living, but end up falling in love. Leon Lai plays a naive Northerner, Li Xiao-Jun (T: 黎小軍, S: 黎小军), and Maggie Cheung plays an opportunist/entrepreneur and Cantonese speaker from Guangzhou, Li Qiao (T: 李 翹, S: 李 翘), who takes advantage of mainlanders like herself for financial gains. The loneliness of living in the big city inevitably brings the two into a passionate love affair. But their different ambitions (Li Xiao-Jun wants to bring his fiancé to Hong Kong; Li Qiao wants to get rich) mean that they are unable to be together. Eventually, Li Xiao-Jun marries his fiancée, Fang Xiaoting (方小婷) (Yang) in Hong Kong and Li Qiao winds up in a relationship with a mob boss named Ouyang Pao (T: 歐陽豹, S: 欧阳豹, P: Ōuyáng Bào) (Tsang). Li Qiao also becomes a successful entrepreneur, achieving her Hong Kong dream. Despite their seemingly separate lives, however, they are still in love and they have one final tryst in the room they used to share before they are separated again.

Burdened by guilt and his love for Li Qiao, Xiao-Jun confesses to his wife that he has not been faithful. He then leaves Hong Kong, and becomes a cook in the United States. Pao, chased by the Hong Kong police, escapes with Li Qiao to the U.S. as illegal immigrants. After almost 10 years, Xiao-Jun and Li Qiao meet again as lonely immigrants in the U.S. (after the latter gets her green card). By then, both of them have already been freed from their previous partners - Xiao-Jun left his wife, and Pao is killed in a mugging in the U.S. The film ends with Xiao-Jun and Li Qiao fatefully meeting each other in front of an electronic store that has a display television playing a music video by Teresa Teng, after news of the singer's death had broken. It is revealed that the two had sat back to back on their first train ride to Hong Kong.

Production
The Chinese title of the film, 'Tian Mi Mi', comes from a song of the same name by Teresa Teng, which is famous both in mainland China and among the overseas Chinese community. The movie displays love of the famous singer who died a year before the film was released; the film is considered a love poem in memory of Teresa Teng. Her music is featured prominently throughout the film, and Teresa Teng herself is an important subplot for the movie. Leon Lai sings the title song for the ending credits. In a cameo performance, Christopher Doyle, the internationally known cinematographer famous for his collaboration with Wong Kar-wai, plays an English teacher.

Lai was mostly known as a "pop idol" at the time while Cheung was considered an "established character actress", causing some people who knew Chan to doubt their pairing. However, Chan stated that he has originally considered Faye Wong for the role based on her mainland origins, but she turned it down, leading him to cast Cheung instead.

Release
Comrades: Almost a Love Story was released in Hong Kong on 2 November 1996. The film grossed a total of HK$15,557,580 on its initial theatrical run in Hong Kong.

The film was screened theatrically for the first time in nearly a decade at the Hong Kong International Film Festival in 2012 with a new 35 mm print supervised by director Peter Chan. The film will be shown at the 70th Venice International Film Festival in 2013.

Initially the Mainland Chinese government put restrictions on the film, but they were lifted in 2015. As part of the Mainland Chinese release, Luhan recorded a new version of the song "Tian Mi Mi". Hua Hsu of The New Yorker states that the reasons why the film was restricted were "slight, couched in minor differences of speech and habit" and that "even the most ideological viewer would be hard pressed to interpret this as an aggressively political film."

Reception
The film was very well received in Hong Kong and Taiwan, winning best picture, director, and actress for the Hong Kong Film Awards, among other wins. Maggie Cheung's performance also won general acclaim. The movie was voted #11 of the Greatest Chinese Films of all time by the Chinese Movie Database and #28 of the 100 Greatest Chinese Films by the Hong Kong Film Awards. It is also listed in the 100 Greatest Chinese Films of the 20th Century by Asia Weekly Magazine.

In 2011, the Taipei Golden Horse Film Festival listed Comrades: Almost a Love Story at number 16 in their list of "100 Greatest Chinese-Language Films". The majority of the voters originated from Taiwan, and included film scholars, festival programmers, film directors, actors and producers.

Awards and nominations

Awards 
23rd Seattle International Film Festival
 Best Film (Golden Space Needle)

16th Hong Kong Film Awards
 Best Picture
 Best Director - Peter Chan Ho-Sun
 Best Actress - Maggie Cheung Man-Yuk 
 Best Supporting Actor - Eric Tsang Chi-Wai
 Best Screenplay - Ivy Ho
 Best Cinematography - Jingle Ma Chor-Sing
 Best Art Direction - Hai Chung-Man
 Best Costume Design - Ng Lei-Lo
 Best Original Music Score - Chui Jun-Fun

Nominations
 Best Actor - Leon Lai
 Best Newcomer - Kristy Yang

34th Golden Horse Film Awards
 Best Picture
 Best Actress

See also 
 List of Hong Kong films
 Cinema of Hong Kong

Notes and references

External links 
 
 

1996 films
1996 romantic comedy-drama films
Hong Kong romantic comedy-drama films 
1990s Cantonese-language films
Best Film HKFA
Films about infidelity
Films set in Hong Kong
Films set in New York City
Films directed by Peter Chan
Triad films
1996 comedy films
1996 drama films
1990s Hong Kong films